Mount Buggery is a mountain located in the Alpine Shire within the Alpine National Park in the alpine region of Victoria, Australia.

Etymology
There is circumstantial evidence that the mountain was named by a member of the Melbourne Walking Club who, during 1934, hiked along the BucklandBuffalo watershed to Mount Selwyn, and then on to the Barry Mountains to Mount Speculation, followed the Crosscut Saw to Mount Howitt, and finished at Merrijig via the Howqua River. Other members of the hiking party and within the Melbourne Walking Club started using the name, and it eventually appeared on maps; official acceptance followed.

See also

 Alpine National Park
 List of mountains in Victoria

References

Further reading

Mountains of Victoria (Australia)
Alpine National Park
Mountains of Hume (region)